Karnafuli Group is one of the largest Bangladeshi industrial conglomerates. The industries under this conglomerate include port, shipping and logistics, media, health care, real estate, automobiles, finance, insurance etc. The Managing Director of the group is Saber Hossain Chowdhury, an Awami League member of parliament and son of Hedayet Hossain Chowdhury who is also a director of HRC Group, another Bangladeshi conglomerate.

History 
Karnafuli Group was established in 1954 by Hedayet Hossain Chowdhury. The group is named after the Karnaphuli River. Hedayet Hossain Chowdhury's grandson, Hamdan Hossain Chowdhury, is a director of the group.

In 2014, the group signed an agreement to distribute and service Haojue motorcycles of China in Bangladesh. Karnaphuli Group, Metro Group, and Partex Star Group (Partex Group) founded Sky Telecommunication which launched Zelta mobiles in 2015.

Karnaphuli Group is the only Bangladeshi group involved container shipping and owns 65 vessels. It operates Chittagong to Colombo and Chittagong to Singapore and Port Klang line.

In 2016, the group's partner Hanjin Shipping Lines, a South Korean company, declared bankruptcy in Bangladesh.

List of companies
Shipping and logistics
 HR Lines Limited
 EasyFly Access Limited
 K&T Logistics Limited

Media
 Bhorer Kagoj - Daily Bengali newspaper
 Diner Sheshey - evening Bengali newspaper
 The New Paper- English daily newspaper
 Desh TV- Bengali TV channel

Healthcare
 Sobujmati Sheba

Real estate
 Karnaphuli Garden City

Financials
 Republic Insurance Company Limited (RICL)

Telecommunication
 Voicetel

 Trading 
 Karnaphuli Works Limited

See also
 List of companies of Bangladesh

References

External links
 

Conglomerate companies of Bangladesh
Companies based in Chittagong
1954 establishments in East Pakistan